The Asian Football Confederation's 1977 AFC Women's Championship was the second AFC Women's Championship. It was held from 2 to 11 August 1977 in Taipei, Republic of China. The tournament was won by the Republic of China for the first time, who defeated Thailand in the final.

Entrants

Notes

Group stage

Group A

Group B

Knock-out stage

Semi-final

Third place match

Final

Winner

See also
 List of sporting events in Taiwan

External links
RSSSF.com

Women's Championship
AFC Women's Asian Cup tournaments
International association football competitions hosted by Taiwan
Afc
AFC Championship
AFC Women's Championship
AFC Women's Championship